Memory Love is a 2017 Taiwanese television series created and produced by SETTV. It stars Andy Chen, Mandy Wei, Jolin Chien, Mandy Tao, Kris Shen and Nylon Chen as the main cast. Filming began on 11 July 2017 and ended on 27 November 2017. It was first broadcast on 6 August 2017 on TTV and airs every Sunday night from 10pm to 11.30pm.

Cast

Main cast
 as Xing Shao Tian (Louis)
Zhu You Cheng as child Shao Tian
Mandy Wei as Qiao Jia En / Jin Jia En (Anne)
Jolin Chien as Duan Ruo Fan 
 as Zhao Ai Li
 as Li Xiao Fei 
Nylon Chen as Wang Xiu Kai

Supporting cast
 as Zhou Chao Qun 
Roy Chang as Ye Ni (Brownie)
Shen You Cheng (沈佑承) as child Brownie
 as Napoleon 
 as Ou Fei Xiang 
Yang Chieh-mei as Xing Mei Yu
 as Duan Chang Feng 
 as Jiang Hui Yuan 
 as Jin Da Zheng 
 as Zhang Mei Lan
 as Sun Hu (Brother Fei Hu)

Cameo
Chen Chih-yuan as Brother Bao
Cindy Yen as Jenny
 as herself
 as orphanage director
 as Brother Chen
Chen Xian Lue as security at the membership club
 as Qiao Shu Zhen
 as Marco
Lin Yun Xi as Mei Miao
Li Cheng Ta as Ah Da
 as suit shop owner
 as Ye Ke (Ye Zi)
Chen Jia Kui as Stephen
Zhu Jia Yi as Lily
Chapman To as noodle stand owner
Guan Jin Zong as physician

Soundtrack
"The Song You Picked Saves Me 你點的歌救了我" by A-Lin feat. J.Sheon
"You're Gone" by Bii
"Be Your Light" by  Bii
"I Need You Girl 愛你就夠了" by  Bii
"Think of You 我想你了" by  Bii
"Nothing at All" by  Bii
"Egg 蛋" by  Bii
"Pseudo-Single, Yet Single 未單身" by A-Lin
"Breathing 呼吸" by J.Sheon
"I Saw It Coming 以分手為前提" by Ailing Tai 
"Weakness 懦弱" by Ailing Tai
"Dear World 親愛的世界" by Maggie Chiang

Broadcast

Ratings

Competing dramas on rival channels airing at the same time slot were:
CTV - Attention, Love!
CTS - Doctors
EBC Variety - Jojo's World
FTV - The Best of Youth, Wake Up 2, TOP Secret

References

External links
 Memory Love TTV official website
 Memory Love SETTV official website
Memory Love on Facebook

2017 Taiwanese television series debuts
2017 Taiwanese television series endings
Taiwan Television original programming
Sanlih E-Television original programming
Taiwanese drama television series
Taiwanese romance television series